Rasey is a surname. Notable people with the surname include:

Jean Rasey (born 1954), American actress
Thomas Rasey (1898–1989), Australian politician
Uan Rasey (1921–2011), American musician

See also
Raley
Ramsey (disambiguation)